ESPN+ is an American over-the-top subscription video streaming service available in the United States, owned by the ESPN division of the Walt Disney Company, in partnership with ESPN Inc., which is a joint venture between The Walt Disney Company (which owns a controlling 80% stake) and the Hearst Communications (which owns the remaining 20%). It is one of Disney's three flagship subscription streaming brands in the United States, alongside Disney+ and Hulu, and operates using technology of Disney subsidiary BAMTech, now known as Disney Streaming.

ESPN+ is marketed as an add-on to ESPN's core linear networks, with some of ESPN+'s content previously offered exclusively to cable subscribers via ESPN3 and the WatchESPN app. ESPN+ does not include access to these services, as they continue to only be available through television providers. Thus, some of ESPN's sports rights are not carried on ESPN+.

Featured content on ESPN+ includes combat sports (including coverage of the Ultimate Fighting Championship and Top Rank boxing), college sports, hockey (including 75 exclusive National Hockey League games per-season and all out-of-market games), rugby union, soccer (including out-of-market Major League Soccer matches), golf (including PGA Tour Live and coverage of the PGA Championship), tennis, and cricket. Major League Baseball's out-of-market sports package, also operated through BAMTech, is sold through the platform as an add-on. The service also features archive content, ESPN original documentaries, and access to premium content on ESPN.com. 
 
, ESPN+ has a total of 24.9 million subscribers.

History
In August 2016, The Walt Disney Company acquired a minority stake in BAMTech, a spin-out of MLB Advanced Media's streaming technology business, for $1 billion, with an option to acquire a majority stake in the future. It was also announced that Disney subsidiary ESPN was planning to develop an over-the-top service based on BAMTech technology as "an exploratory OTT project", drawing primarily from ESPN-owned rights for events not broadcast on television. ESPN already used BAMTech's platform for its TV Everywhere service WatchESPN. Disney CEO Bob Iger remarked that despite declines in the pay television industry due to cord-cutting, "live sports has really thrived, even in a world where there's so much more for people to do and to watch."

In August 2017, Disney invoked its option to acquire a controlling stake in BAMTech, and announced that it planned to launch its ESPN OTT service in 2018, followed by a Disney entertainment OTT service in 2019 (thus ending its relationship with Netflix). At this time, Disney stated that the new ESPN service would draw from ESPN-owned sports rights, as well as MLB, NHL, and Major League Soccer content (although lacking major ESPN-owned rights such as the NBA and NFL), and that an accompanying redesign of the ESPN app would make it a "premier digital destination" for sports content. During Disney's fourth-quarter earnings call, Iger revealed that the service would be known as ESPN+. In December 2017, Disney announced its intent to acquire 21st Century Fox after the spin-off of certain businesses. The deal was to include the Fox Sports Networks group of regional sports networks (which Disney was ordered to divest under antitrust grounds), which led to suggestions that Disney wanted to incorporate FSN's regional sports rights into the service.

In February 2018, Iger stated that ESPN was aiming for a monthly price of $4.99. ESPN+ and BAMTech were placed into the newly formed Disney business segment, Disney Direct-to-Consumer and International, on March 14, 2018. On April 2, 2018, ESPN announced that ESPN+ would officially launch on April 12, 2018, and confirmed its $4.99 per-month pricing.

On August 21, 2018, ESPN.com's existing subscription service ESPN Insider was discontinued and folded into ESPN+, adding its premium web content (such as exclusive beat reports, and advanced sports statistics, analytics, and fantasy sports tools) to the service. Both services shared the same monthly price, but ESPN Insider subscribers continued to receive the complimentary subscription to ESPN The Magazine that was included (until its discontinuation in September 2019), and annual subscribers were grandfathered under its previous $39.99 per-year price (as opposed to $49.99 for ESPN+).

On October 31, 2018, ESPN executive Russell Wolff was named executive vice president and general manager. In October 2019, ESPN+ began to add pre-roll advertising to on-demand content on the service. Concurrent with the launch of Disney+ on November 12, 2019, the Disney Bundle was introduced, allowing users to subscribe to ESPN+, Disney+, and the ad-supported tier of Hulu for $12.99 per-month.

On October 22, 2020, it was announced that a larger amount of ESPN.com articles (primarily analysis) would become paywalled behind ESPN+. It was also announced that video simulcasts of the ESPN Radio programs The Dan Le Batard Show, Greeny, The Max Kellerman Show, and Chiney & Golic Jr., as well as Jorge Ramos y Su Banda, would be moved exclusively to ESPN+ from the ESPN networks.

In July 2022, Disney announced that the standalone monthly price of ESPN+, which reached $6.99 per month in 2021 following two smaller increases, would jump by three dollars, or 43%, to $9.99 per month beginning in late August. Observers speculated that the increase was intended to promote uptake of the Disney Bundle, which continued at the then current $13.99 price point, while remaining competitive relative to other standalone sports streaming services.

Programming
Its launch content included boxing (including Top Rank events and archive content through 2025, and includes 36 exclusive fight cards), college sports events (including Ivy League events, with the conference having reached a 10-year media rights deal with ESPN prior to the service's launch), coverage of Tennis Grand Slams, as well as international cricket (India national cricket team, Cricket Ireland, and New Zealand Cricket), soccer (including Major League Soccer, the United Soccer League, the U.S. Open Cup, 2019 Copa America, the English Football League (including Cup), Serie A, Eredivisie, A-League, FFA Cup, W-League, FA Cup, and UEFA Nations League) and rugby union events (including SANZAAR tournaments, Bledisloe Cup, Currie Cup, Major League Rugby, Mitre 10 Cup, and Pro14). In October 2018, ESPN+ obtained the rights for the Swedish Allsvenskan and the Danish Superliga as well, declaring their intent to broadcast one match per week for each league.  In February 2021, ESPN+ obtained the rights for the Belgian Pro League, and are expected to broadcast 3 matches per week.

ESPN+ features out of market Major League Soccer matches at no additional charge for subscribers (replacing the previous MLS Live service), and the service held exclusive rights to all regionally televised Chicago Fire matches through 2020 (as the second MLS team, behind Los Angeles FC's deal with YouTube TV, to sell its regional rights to a streaming service). As of the 2021–22 season, ESPN+ carries out-of-market National Hockey League games under the NHL Power Play on ESPN+ banner (replacing the previous NHL.tv service). MLB.tv is also available for purchase within the ESPN+ platform, and offers daily games during their regular seasons.

PGA Tour Live (which was also ran by BAMTech) was included for the 2018 PGA Tour season, but moved to NBC Sports Gold in 2019. ESPN+ will offer supplemental feeds during the PGA Championship beginning 2020, including during CBS broadcast windows. In 2022, PGA Tour Live returned to ESPN+ as part of a new long-term deal through 2030.

In March 2019, the American Athletic Conference announced a 12-year media rights deal with ESPN, under which ESPN+ will carry the majority of events not aired by ESPN's linear channels. In May 2019, it was announced that ESPN+ would carry 18 World TeamTennis matches. In September 2019, ESPN+ announced its acquisition of rights to Germany's Bundesliga soccer league beginning in 2020, under a six-year deal. 

In the 2019–20 season, ESPN+ acquired the third-tier media rights for all but two Big 12 Conference teams; these telecasts are carried under the branding Big 12 Now. The deal excluded the Oklahoma Sooners–whose third-tier rights were held by the SoonerSports.tv streaming service and Bally Sports Oklahoma, and the Texas Longhorns–who have an existing agreement with ESPN and IMG College to run Longhorn Network.  

During the 2020 Major League Baseball season's Wild Card Series round, ESPN+ aired Squeeze Play—which featured live look-ins and analysis of the seven series ESPN held rights to (in a similar manner to the ESPN Bases Loaded service it offered during the NCAA baseball tournament), as well as Statcast broadcasts of selected games.

On March 10, 2021, ESPN re-acquired rights to the National Hockey League under a new seven-year deal beginning in the 2021–22 season. Under this contract, ESPN+ holds exclusive rights to 75 games per-season, which will also be available on Hulu, simulcast rights to all games on ABC (including the NHL All-Star Game, and the Stanley Cup Finals in selected seasons), and streams all out-of-market games.

A week later, as part of ESPN's renewal of its rights to the NFL, ESPN+ gained simulcast rights to Monday Night Football broadcasts beginning in the 2021 NFL season. Beginning in 2022, ESPN+ will hold exclusive rights to one NFL International Series game per-season in a Sunday morning window.

In September 2021, Disney began to wind down the U.S. version of Hotstar, a streaming service targeting Indian Americans, and migrated its content exclusively to ESPN+ and Hulu. This, in particular, includes its rights to home matches of the India national cricket team and Indian Premier League, which had been sub-licensed to ESPN+ via its sister network Star Sports.

On April 8, 2022, ESPN announced a deal with the Savannah Bananas to live stream two games of their Banana Ball World Tour on April 8 and 9.

In May 2022, ESPN announced its acquisition of the third-tier media rights to Oklahoma Sooners athletics; the events will be carried on ESPN+ under the "SoonerVision on ESPN+" branding, and will include one exclusive football game per-season (which had previously been distributed by Bally/Fox Sports pay-per-view). The deal will be in effect through the 2024–25 athletics season, after which the Sooners will exit the Big 12 and move to the Southeastern Conference (SEC)—whose media rights are fully-owned by ESPN. Later that month, ESPN announced a rights agreement with the Northwoods League to stream select games of their 2022 season each day exclusively on ESPN+, along with the Northwoods League All-Star Game, the Major League Dreams Showcase, the League playoffs and Summer Collegiate World Series.

UFC 
In May 2018, the Ultimate Fighting Championship (UFC) announced new five-year digital and linear television rights deals with ESPN, effective January 2019. 20 UFC on ESPN+ Fight Night cards per-year are streamed exclusively by the service, as well as preliminaries for 10 UFC on ESPN Fight Night cards per-year. ESPN+ will also hold rights to supplemental content such as Dana White's Contender Series, archive content and PPV encores, and offer sales of UFC Fight Pass within the platform. The first ESPN+ event, UFC Fight Night: Cejudo vs. Dillashaw, generated 525,000 new subscribers on the day of the event alone.

On March 18, 2019, it was announced that ESPN had reached a two-year extension of its contract with the UFC. Beginning with UFC 236, ESPN+ became the exclusive U.S. distributor of all UFC pay-per-view events for residential customers; they are no longer sold through television providers, and viewers must have an ESPN+ subscription in order to buy them.

Sports rights 
ESPN+ initially focused on overflow content, similar to that of ESPN3 (which is distributed to subscribers of participating internet and television subscribers). Some of ESPN3's content has since moved to ESPN+. It has since been incorporated more extensively into ESPN's later media rights deals.

Professional sports

Cricket 
 National teams
 India national cricket team (BCCI) (Hindi and English rights, sublicensed from Star Sports, a sister network owned by Disney's Indian subsidiary Disney Star)
 West Indies national cricket team 
 New Zealand national cricket team (home match rights until 2026)
 ICC events (including the 2021 ICC Men's T20 World Cup and 2022 Women's Cricket World Cup)
 T20 leagues
 New Zealand's Super Smash

Association football 
 United States
 USL Championship
 USL League One
 U.S. Open Cup
College soccer

 Mexico
 Liga MX
 Liga MX Femenil

 Europe

 Spain
 La Liga
 Segunda División
 Copa del Rey
 Supercopa de España
 Copa De La Renia
 Supercopa de España Femenina

 England
 EFL Championship
 EFL League One
 EFL League Two
 FA Cup
 EFL Cup
 FA Community Shield
 Women's FA Cup
 Women's FA Community Shield
 EFL Trophy

 Germany
 Bundesliga
 2.Bundesliga
 DFB-Pokal
 DFL-Supercup

 Netherlands
 Eredivisie

 Sweden
 Allsvenskan

 Belgium
 Belgian First Division A
 Belgian Cup
 Belgian Super Cup

Auto racing 
 Formula One (Eighteen races on ESPN+, including the Miami Grand Prix, U.S. Grand Prix, and Las Vegas Grand Prix as of 2023)

Baseball                                                   
 Major League Baseball

Football 
 National Football League
 Simulcasts of all Monday Night Football games aired on ABC and select ESPN games (including the popular Manningcast in select weeks)
 One exclusive NFL International Series game per-season.
 Canadian Football League
 Most games, simulcast from Canadian partner TSN

Basketball 
 National Basketball Association
 Simulcasts of select games aired on ESPN and/or ABC (including the NBA in Stephen A’s World alternate broadcast)

Combat sports 
 Ultimate Fighting Championship
 All UFC pay-per-view events (requires additional purchase)
 20 exclusive ESPN+ Fight Night cards per-year
 Preliminaries for 10 ESPN Fight Night cards per-year
 Archive and supplemental content
 Top Rank boxing (through 2025)
 12 exclusive primetime cards per-year
 24 exclusive international cards per-year
 Preliminaries for 18 Top Rank Boxing on ESPN cards per-year
 Archive and supplemental content
 Professional Fighters League

Esports 
 League Championship Series

Golf 
 Masters Tournament
 Masters Live supplemental feeds 
 Masters Tournament official films library on-demand
 PGA Championship
 Supplemental feeds.
 PGA Championship official films library on-demand
 PGA Tour
 PGA Tour Live supplemental coverage.

Ice hockey 
 National Hockey League
 Up to 75 exclusive regular season games per-season. Games are also available on Hulu.
 Simulcasts of all games aired by ABC (including ABC Hockey Saturday and the Stanley Cup Finals), and select ESPN games (including Opening Night)
 All out-of-market games, and on-demand replays of all nationally-televised games (under the NHL Power Play on ESPN+ branding)
 Ice Hockey World Championships
 Kontinental Hockey League
 Premier Hockey Federation
 Hockey East

Lacrosse 
 World Lacrosse Championship
 National Lacrosse League
 Premier Lacrosse League

Tennis 
 U.S. Open
 Australian Open
 Wimbledon
 World TeamTennis

College sports

American football 
 American Athletic Conference
 Events not carried on ESPN linear networks
 Big 12 Conference
 Third tier media rights to most Big 12 teams (under either the Big 12 Now or SoonerVision on ESPN+ branding), excluding the Texas Longhorns whose rights are to Longhorn Network (owned by ESPN)
 Big Sky Conference
 Big South Conference
 Ivy League
 Metro Atlantic Athletic Conference
 Mid-American Conference
 Missouri Valley Football Conference
 Conference USA
 Ohio Valley Conference
 Patriot League
 Southern Conference
 Southland Conference
 Sun Belt Conference
 Western Athletic Conference

Basketball 
 American Athletic Conference
 America East Conference
 Atlantic 10 Conference
 ASUN Conference
 Big 12 Conference
 Big Sky Conference
 Big South Conference
 Big West Conference
 Horizon League
 Ivy League
 Metro Atlantic Athletic Conference
 Mid-American Conference
 Missouri Valley Conference
 Conference USA
 Ohio Valley Conference
 Patriot League
 Southern Conference
 Southland Conference
 Sun Belt Conference
 Western Athletic Conference

Baseball 
 Northwoods League

Original programming 
ESPN+ also carries ESPN original programming and documentaries, such as the 30 for 30 franchise (with some premiering on ESPN+ prior to their premiere on ESPN), and exclusive original series and studio programs:

 Detail – A franchise of programs featuring analysis of sports by associated players. The initial, basketball version of the series was hosted and produced by Kobe Bryant until his death in January 2020. In October 2018, ESPN announced that Peyton Manning would host an NFL version of the program. On June 29, 2019, ESPN announced a mixed martial arts version of the program hosted by Daniel Cormier. Golden State Warriors head coach and former Chicago Bulls player Steve Kerr, along with former Bulls coach Phil Jackson, hosted special episodes focused on the Michael Jordan-led Bulls dynasty in the 1990s, as a tie-in for the ESPN documentary miniseries The Last Dance.
 ESPN FC – A studio program focusing on soccer; it moved from airing on the networks to exclusively being on ESPN+.
 In The Crease – a daily NHL highlight and discussion show hosted by Linda Cohn.
 Quest for the Stanley Cup – A documentary series following the Stanley Cup playoffs (moved from Showtime).
 Last Train to Russia – A documentary series previewing the 2018 FIFA World Cup.
 Year One – A documentary series following the 2017–2018 NBA Rookie Class, featuring Jayson Tatum, Ben Simmons, and Donovan Mitchell.
 MLS Rewind – A weekly recap of Major League Soccer action, hosted by Taylor Twellman and featuring analysis from Alejandro Moreno.
 I'll Take That Bet – A series focusing on sports betting, in conjunction with The Action Network.
 Ariel and the Bad Guy – A weekly mixed martial arts discussion show hosted by Ariel Helwani and Chael Sonnen.
 The Fantasy Show – A fantasy football analysis show hosted by Matthew Berry. Originally aired on ESPN2 in its first season.
 Always Late with Katie Nolan – A late night talk show-inspired series hosted by Katie Nolan, serving as a successor to her previous Fox Sports 1 program Garbage Time. The start of its second season in late September 2019 saw it carried on ESPN2 on Thursday evenings as well. The series was cancelled in 2020.
 Peyton's Places – A documentary series hosted by former NFL quarterback Peyton Manning. The franchise expanded to include spin-offs hosted by Eli Manning (college football), Abby Wambach (soccer), Vince Carter (basketball) and Ronda Rousey (combat sports).
 NFL PrimeTime – Hosted by Chris Berman and Tom Jackson, a digital-only version of the popular NFL highlight show that aired on ESPN for nearly 30 years. The program airs live at 7:30 p.m. on Sunday nights during the regular season, recapping the afternoon's games. The show is updated with segments recapping the Sunday and Monday-night games after their completion, which are respectively hosted by Scott Van Pelt, Steve Levy, and previously, Joe Tessitore.
 Miles to Go – a documentary series following Les Miles, coach of the Kansas Jayhawks football team.
Fútbol Americas – A breakdown and analysis of soccer from a North American perspective, with highlights from North American leagues (mostly MLS, Liga MX, and NWSL), as well as national teams, CONCACAF competitions, and North American players playing abroad in Europe. Hosted by Sebastian Salazar and Herculez Gomez, with new episodes every Monday and Thursday.

Other programming 
 In the 2019 Formula One season, ESPN+ began to carry Sky Sports F1's studio shows Pit Lane Live and Welcome To the Weekend.

See also
 List of streaming media services

References

External links

 

College basketball on television in the United States
College football on television
ESPN
Internet properties established in 2018
Internet television channels
Subscription video streaming services